The Ambassador of the Republic of the Philippines to the Argentine Republic is the Republic of the Philippines' foremost diplomatic representative in Argentina. As head of the Philippines' diplomatic mission there, the Ambassador is the official representative of the President and the Government of the Philippines to the President and Government of Argentina. The position has the rank and status of an Ambassador Extraordinary and Plenipotentiary and is based at the embassy located in Buenos Aires, the capital of the country.

This ambassador post is also accredited as a non-resident ambassador to the countries of Bolivia, Paraguay, and Uruguay.

Heads of mission

See also
Argentina–Philippines relations

References

Notes

External links

 
Philippines
Argentina